You're a Good Man, Charlie Brown is a 1967 musical with music and lyrics by Clark Gesner and (in a 1999 revision) Andrew Lippa. It is based on the characters created by cartoonist Charles M. Schulz in his comic strip Peanuts. The musical has been a popular choice for amateur theatre productions because of its small cast and simple staging.

Background 
John Gordon was credited with the book of the show, but according to Gesner's foreword in the published script, "John Gordon" is a collective pseudonym that covers Gesner, the cast members, and the production staff, all of whom worked together to assemble the script. The Guide to Musical Theatre notes that "John Gordon is a pseudonym for the staff and cast of the show. The original cast included Bob Balaban, Gary Burghoff, Bill Hinnant, Skip Hinnant, Karen Johnson and Reva Rose."

History 
During the early 1960s, Gesner had begun writing songs based on Charles Schulz's  Peanuts characters, but was unable to get permission from United Feature Syndicate to use the characters in his songs. Eventually Gesner sent Schulz a demo recording of some of the songs and Gesner soon had permission to properly record them, which he did in 1966. Orson Bean sang the role of Charlie Brown, Clark Gesner sang Linus, Barbara Minkus sang Lucy, and Bill Hinnant sang Snoopy (he reprised his role in the Off-Broadway production).

At the time, Gesner had no plans for a musical based on this pre-production "concept album". However, producer Arthur Whitelaw, who would later go on to write another musical based on Peanuts entitled: Snoopy! The Musical, encouraged Gesner to turn the album into a musical.

The stage adaptation of the concept album, titled You're a Good Man, Charlie Brown, went into rehearsal in New York City on February 10, 1967. Prior to its opening, the musical had no actual libretto; it was several vignettes with a musical number for each one.

Productions

Original New York productions and U.S. tours

On March 7, 1967, the musical premiered off-Broadway at Theatre 80 in the East Village, featuring Gary Burghoff as Charlie Brown, Skip Hinnant as Schroeder, Reva Rose as Lucy, Bob Balaban as Linus, Karen Johnson as Patty (an early Peanuts character not to be confused with Peppermint Patty), and Bill Hinnant as Snoopy. Joseph Hardy directed and choreographer Patricia Birch was billed as "Assistant to the Director". Joe Raposo, later of Sesame Street fame, was billed as "Music Director" and composer of incidental music for the show. This production of You're A Good Man, Charlie Brown lasted 1,597 performances, closing on February 14, 1971.

The off-Broadway cast recording, originally released on MGM Records, was later remastered by Decca Broadway/Universal Classics and re-released on September 31, 2000. A 1970 U.S. tour lasted 202 performances on the road.

A Broadway production opened at the John Golden Theatre on June 1, 1971, and closed on June 27, 1971, after 32 performances and 15 previews. Directed by Joseph Hardy and with choreography by Patricia Birch, the new cast consisted of Carter Cole as Schroeder, Grant Cowan as Snoopy, Stephen Fenning as Linus, Liz O'Neal as Lucy, Dean Stolber as Charlie Brown, and Lee Wilson as Patty.

1968 West End premiere

The musical opened in the West End in London on February 1, 1968, produced by Harold Fielding and Bernard Delfont, and directed by original 1967 director Joseph Hardy. It played at the Fortune Theatre for 116 performances, until closing on May 11, 1968. The whole original Toronto cast reprised their roles for West End. Don Potter, who portrayed Snoopy, reprised his role in the original San Francisco cast of Snoopy! The Musical.

1986 television special

1998 U.S. tour and 1999 Broadway revival
A U.S. tour began on November 18, 1998, in Skokie, Illinois. The tour was expected to become a full-scale revival to open at the Longacre Theatre on Broadway, but was moved to the Ambassador Theatre after Bring in 'Da Noise, Bring in 'Da Funks closing. After the tour ended on January 17, 1999, the revival opened on February 4, 1999, and closed on June 13, 1999, having played 14 previews and 149 performances. It featured new dialogue by Michael Mayer, who also directed, and additional songs and orchestration written by Andrew Lippa; choreography was by Jerry Mitchell and sets by David Gallo, Mayer's frequent collaborator.

In this revival, the character of Patty was replaced with Sally Brown, inspired by the same change Schulz made in the animated TV adaptation. The cast featured Anthony Rapp as Charlie Brown, B.D. Wong as Linus, Ilana Levine as Lucy, and Stanley Wayne Mathis as Schroeder. Also featured were Kristin Chenoweth and Roger Bart as Sally and Snoopy, with each winning the Tony award in the respective category. Kirsten Wyatt was the standby for Lucy and Sally.

The original Broadway revival recording was released by RCA Victor/BMG on March 9, 1999.

The 1999 cast appeared on The Rosie O'Donnell Show to promote the show, singing "Beethoven Day."  O'Donnell joined in with the cast to close her show by performing the finale as the credits rolled.

2008 Manhattan benefit concert
On December 15, 2008, a one-night-only benefit performance of Charlie Brown was staged at the Gerald W. Lynch Theater at John Jay College in Manhattan for the Make-A-Wish Foundation, directed by David Lefkowich. The cast featured Morgan Karr as Charlie Brown, David Larsen as Schroeder, Tom Deckman as Snoopy, Matt Crowle as Linus, Carmen Ruby Floyd as Lucy, and Kenita R. Miller as Sally.

2016 Off-Broadway revival
The musical was revived at the Off-Broadway York Theatre Company. The revival used some young actors from Broadway productions. The six-member “Peanuts” gang featured Joshua Colley as Charlie Brown, Gregory Diaz as Schroeder, Aidan Gemme as Snoopy, Milly Shapiro as Sally, Mavis Simpson-Ernst as Lucy, and Jeremy T. Villas as Linus. Graydon Peter Yosowitz played the role of Charlie Brown from June 1–7. The production ran from May 24 – June 26, 2016.

Synopsis

Original
Act I
Charlie Brown and Linus are together, as his friends give their various opinions of him ("Opening"). Today everyone is calling him a "good man". They state he could be king. Lucy, however says he could be king if he wasn't so wishy-washy ("You're A Good Man, Charlie Brown"). Lucy expresses her deep infatuation with Schroeder and asks him what he thinks of the idea of marriage. Schroeder is aware of her feelings, but remains aloof as he plays his piano. Lucy then exclaims: "My Aunt Marion was right. Never try to discuss marriage with a musician" ("Schroeder").

Schroeder is walking around in the sun, happy with all the peace and quiet. However, that is soon interrupted by Lucy screaming for a ball. Snoopy is lying on top of his doghouse, relaxing vacantly and peacefully. He daydreams that all the children are adoring him, and saying he's “the best dog in the world”. Birds start to poke his stomach, and then he begins to daydream about being a wild jungle beast. In a few minutes, however, he is back to his peaceful state ("Snoopy").

Linus enters, holding his blanket and sucking his thumb. Lucy and Patty show up and mock him for this habit. Lucy tries to pull away the blanket, but fails. Linus decides to abandon his blanket and move on, only to come running back to it in desperation. After the girls leave, Linus decides to relax with his blanket until he can outgrow it ("My Blanket and Me"). Charlie Brown appears, trying to get his unusually stubborn kite to soar in the air. Eventually, he succeeds in doing this, and he enjoys a few minutes of triumph before the kite plummets to the ground ("The Kite").

After this trauma, Charlie Brown tries to find the right way to give The Little Red-Headed Girl her Valentine's Day card, but he ends up saying "Merry Christmas", making a fool out of himself. He finds Patty handing out valentines, and she drops a valentine with the initials C.B. Charlie Brown gives it back to Patty, but soon learns it was Craig Bowerman's valentine. He goes to see Lucy, who is at her psychiatrist booth. He tells her all the things he thinks of himself. Lucy then clears it up by saying that Charlie Brown is unique the way he is, then asks for the five cent price ("The Doctor Is In").

Later, Lucy comes up to Schroeder again and talks about if they got married, and they were so poor that Schroeder had to sell his piano for saucepans, and, again, Schroeder cannot stand it. At noon, Linus, Lucy, Schroeder, and Charlie Brown are working on their Peter Rabbit book reports, each in his or her own way. Lucy is simply babbling to fit the 100-word requirement, Schroeder is doing a "comparison" between the book and Robin Hood, Linus is doing an overcomplicated psychological analysis, and Charlie Brown hasn't even started out of worry ("The Book Report").

Act II
Snoopy, in his World War I flying ace uniform, climbs atop his doghouse. He goes through a scene, with him being a pilot searching for the Red Baron. In his imagination, he is defeated by the Red Baron and returns to the aerodrome in France ("The Red Baron"). Meanwhile, Charlie Brown returns, and, with his friends, plays the Little League Baseball Championship. After some mishaps, the team finally manages to make some progress. Charlie Brown steps up to the plate, and despite his valiant efforts, strikes out and loses the game. We learn that this was a flashback, and Charlie Brown expresses his deep sorrow to his pen pal ("T-E-A-M (The Baseball Game)").

Later on, Linus and Lucy arrive home. Linus starts to watch TV, but Lucy tells him to switch channels. Lucy tells Linus that what she intends to do when she grows up, she will become a queen. Linus denies, and Lucy decides to cultivate her life for her "natural beauty" ("Queen Lucy"). The next day, at lunchtime, Charlie Brown talks about his bad days. Then he notices the Little Red-Haired Girl approaching and puts a paper bag over his head. It turns out it is Lucy and Patty, chatting together.

At Schroeder's Glee Club, Patty is the only one to arrive early. When everyone comes, it's chaos. Unfortunately, a fight ensues between Lucy and Linus over a pencil. Lucy threatens to tell Patty that Linus called her an enigma. The fight spreads, and Charlie Brown decides to leave with his angry friends, leaving Schroeder and Snoopy the only ones singing ("Glee Club Rehearsal"). Later, Charlie Brown comes across Lucy teaching Linus about nature the way she views it, with "facts" such as bugs pulling the grass to make it grow or snow coming out of the ground in winter. Charlie Brown tries to correct her, but she retaliates with a false explanation, and Charlie Brown bangs his head against a tree in frustration ("Little Known Facts").

The next morning, Snoopy is puzzled why he has his supper in the red dish, and the water in the blue dish. Meanwhile, Linus and Schroeder are walking to school. Schroeder asks if Linus filled out the form that Ms. Othmar gave them. Linus puts down “Dr. Seuss“. Snoopy talks about how he hates cats, but he is also scared of them ("Peanuts Potpourri").  That evening, Snoopy complains that he hasn't been fed yet, and begins to overly complicate and dramatize the matter until Charlie Brown shows up with his dinner. Snoopy bursts into song about his craving for supper until Charlie Brown firmly tells him to eat his meal ("Suppertime").

That night, everyone is looking at the stars in wonder. Charlie Brown soon discovers a pencil which has been dropped by the Little Red-Haired Girl (his perennial crush). As he examines it, he discovers that "there are teeth-marks all over it . . . she nibbles her pencil . . . she's HUMAN!" With that realization, he concludes that today hasn't been so bad, after all, and he's done a lot of things that make him happy. As Charlie Brown expresses what makes him happy, everyone, touched by his love of life, begin to express what makes them happy as well ("Happiness"). Right then, he realizes being a "good man" means trying your best and making the most of the things you've been given in life. As his other friends leave the stage, Lucy turns to him then tells him, "You're a good man, Charlie Brown."

Revised
Act I
Charlie Brown stands alone as his friends give their various opinions of him("Opening"). Today everyone is calling him a "good man". Charlie Brown is happy and hopeful as usual, but he nevertheless wonders if he really is what they say. He decides to find out how he can really become a good person ("You're a Good Man, Charlie Brown").

Alone one day, during lunch, Charlie Brown talks about his bad days. Then he notices the Little Red-Haired Girl and decides to go sit with her. However, he cannot find the courage to do so, and puts a paper bag over his head. It turns out it is Lucy and Sally, chatting together. They draw a dress on the paper bag, while Charlie Brown feels like he has no confidence ("You're a Good Man, Charlie Brown" (reprise))

Lucy expresses her deep infatuation with Schroeder and asks him what he thinks of the idea of marriage. Schroeder is aware of her feelings, but remains aloof as he plays his piano. Lucy then exclaims: "My Aunt Marion was right. Never try to discuss marriage with a musician" ("Schroeder"). Sally is sad because her jump rope tangled up.

Snoopy is lying on top of his doghouse, relaxing vacantly and peacefully. He begins to daydream about being a wild jungle beast. In a few minutes, however, he is back to his peaceful state ("Snoopy"). Linus enters, holding his blanket and sucking his thumb. Lucy and Sally show up and mock him for this habit. Linus decides to abandon his blanket and move on, only to come running back to it in desperation. After the girls leave, Linus daydreams of a blanket fantasy where everyone can relax with their blankets ("My Blanket and Me"). Lucy later tells him that she would someday like to be a queen ("Queen Lucy"). However, Linus tells her that she can't and she threatens to punch him. Sally gets a D for her pathetic coat-hanger sculpture.

Charlie Brown appears, trying to get his unusually stubborn kite to soar in the air. Eventually, he succeeds in doing this, and he enjoys a few minutes of triumph before the notorious Kite-Eating Tree eats it up ("The Kite"). After this trauma, Charlie Brown tries to find the right way to give Lucy a Valentine's Day card, but he ends up saying "Merry Christmas", making a fool out of himself. He later learns that no one sent him a card, whereas everyone else, including Snoopy, got several. He goes to see Lucy, who is at her psychiatrist booth. He tells her all the things he thinks of himself. Lucy then clears it up by saying that Charlie Brown is unique the way he is, then asks for the five cent price ("The Doctor Is In"). Later, Charlie Brown sees a happy Schroeder spreading the word of Beethoven's birthday and pulling together a celebration. He and company join Schroeder in the song of jubilation ("Beethoven Day").

The next morning, Sally wakes up Snoopy to go rabbit chasing, and they go into strange places, like the Sahara. At noon, Linus, Lucy, Schroeder, and Charlie Brown are working on their Peter Rabbit book reports, each in his or her own way. Lucy is simply babbling to fit the 100-word requirement, Schroeder is doing a "comparison" between the book and Robin Hood, Linus is doing an overcomplicated psychological analysis, and Charlie Brown hasn't even started out of worry, while Sally and Snoopy continue to chase rabbits ("The Book Report").

Act II
Snoopy, in his World War I flying ace uniform climbs atop his doghouse. He goes through a scene, with him being a pilot searching for the Red Baron. In his imagination, he is defeated by the Red Baron and returns to the aerodrome in France ("The Red Baron").

Sally is clearly cross about a D her teacher gave her on her homework assignment. In response, she says, "Oh, yeah? That's what you think!" Schroeder hears and asks why Sally is telling him that. It quickly becomes Sally's new "philosophy", and she bursts into song about her philosophies. Schroeder, after failing to explain to her how philosophies work, leaves in bafflement while Sally continues ("My New Philosophy").

Charlie Brown returns, and, with his friends, plays the Little League Baseball Championship. After some mishaps, the team finally manages to make some progress. Charlie Brown steps up to the plate, and despite his valiant efforts, strikes out and loses the game. We learn that this was a flashback, and Charlie Brown expresses his deep sorrow to his pen pal ("T-E-A-M (The Baseball Game)"). After Schroeder tells her she is a very crabby person, Lucy takes a crabbiness survey of all her friends to determine her crabbiness: Charlie Brown gives a waffling answer, while Sally is more definitive. Upon asking Linus, he refuses to answer until she promises not to punch him; when he gives her a score of ninety-five, though, she punches him anyway. After tallying the score, she realizes that she, in reality, is really very crabby and becomes depressed. Linus cheers her up by reminding her she has a little brother who loves her, remarking as she sobs in his shoulder "Every now and then I say the right thing!"

Determined not to let what happened at the championship bother him, Charlie Brown decides to join Schroeder's Glee Club and cheer up by singing "Home on the Range" with his friends. Unfortunately, a fight ensues between Lucy and Linus over a pencil. The fight spreads, and Charlie Brown decides to leave with his angry friends, leaving Schroeder and Snoopy the only ones singing ("Glee Club Rehearsal").

Later, Charlie Brown comes across Lucy teaching Linus about nature the way she views it, with "facts" such as bugs pulling the grass to make it grow or snow growing out of the ground in winter. Charlie Brown tries to correct her, but she retaliates with a false explanation, and Charlie Brown bangs his head against a tree in frustration ("Little Known Facts"). That evening, Snoopy complains that he hasn't been fed yet, and begins to overly complicate and dramatize the matter until Charlie Brown shows up with his dinner. Snoopy bursts into song about his craving for supper until Charlie Brown firmly tells him to eat his meal ("Suppertime").

That night, Charlie Brown is still sad that he has not discovered what it means to be a "good man", then he discovers a pencil which has been dropped by the Little Red-Haired Girl (his perennial crush). As he examines it, he discovers that "there are teeth-marks all over it . . . she nibbles her pencil . . . she's HUMAN!" With that realization, he concludes that today hasn't been so bad, after all, and he's done a lot of things that make him happy. As Charlie Brown expresses what makes him happy, everyone, touched by his love of life, begin to express what makes them happy as well ("Happiness"). Right then, he realizes being a "good man" means trying your best and making the most of the things you've been given in life. As his other friends leave the stage, Lucy turns to him and puts out her hand, making him shrink back. As he reaches out, she shakes his hand firmly, then tells him, "You're a good man, Charlie Brown."

A medley of "Happiness" and "You're a Good Man, Charlie Brown" is performed as the cast comes out for a final curtain call.

Musical numbers
Original

Act I
 "Opening" – Company
 "You're a Good Man, Charlie Brown" – Company
 "Schroeder" – Lucy (sung over Beethoven's "Moonlight Sonata")
 "Snoopy" – Snoopy
 "My Blanket and Me" – Linus
 "The Kite" – Charlie Brown
 "The Doctor is In" (Dr. Lucy) – Lucy and Charlie Brown
 "The Book Report" – Company

Act II
 "Opening, Pt. 2" - Company
 "T-E-A-M (The Baseball Game)" – Charlie Brown and Company
 "The Red Baron" – Snoopy
 "Queen Lucy" – Lucy and Linus
 "Glee Club Rehearsal" – Company (sung over "Home on the Range")
 "Little Known Facts" – Lucy with Linus and Charlie Brown
 "Peanuts Potpourri" – Snoopy, Schroeder, and Linus
 "Suppertime" – Snoopy
 "Happiness" – Company
  Bows – Company (includes a reprise of "You're a Good Man, Charlie Brown")

Note: "Opening, Pt. 2", "Glee Club Rehearsal", and "Bows" was not included in the original cast recording.
Revised

Act I
 "Opening" – Company
 "You're a Good Man, Charlie Brown" – Company
 "You're a Good Man, Charlie Brown" (reprise) – Charlie Brown, Linus, and Sally
 "Schroeder" – Lucy (sung over Beethoven's "Moonlight Sonata")
 "Snoopy" – Snoopy
 "My Blanket and Me" – Linus and Company
 "Queen Lucy" – Lucy and Linus
 "The Kite" – Charlie Brown (optional company background)
 "The Doctor is In" (Dr. Lucy) – Lucy and Charlie Brown
 "Peanuts Potpourri" – Sally, Linus, Snoopy, Lucy, and Schroeder
 "Beethoven Day" – Schroeder and Company
 "Rabbit Chasing" - Sally and Snoopy
 "The Book Report" – Company

Act II
 "The Red Baron" – Snoopy
 "My New Philosophy" – Sally and Schroeder
 "T-E-A-M (The Baseball Game)" – Charlie Brown and Company
 "Glee Club Rehearsal" – Company (sung over "Home on the Range")
 "Little Known Facts" – Lucy with Linus and Charlie Brown
 "Suppertime" – Snoopy
 "Happiness" – Company
 Bows – Company (includes a partial reprise of "Happiness," and "You're a Good Man, Charlie Brown")

Note: The three new songs added to the show ("Beethoven Day", "Rabbit Chasing", and "My New Philosophy") are by Andrew Lippa.  "You're a Good Man, Charlie Brown Reprise", "Queen Lucy", "Peanuts Potpourri", "Rabbit Chasing", and "The Red Baron" are not included in the 1999 revival Broadway cast recording.

Instrumentation

The instrumentation varies greatly and three kinds exist.

In the original Off-Broadway production, the instrumentation was simply a piano (doubling on toy piano and melodica), a bass, and percussion. It can be heard on the original cast recording.

When Tams-Witmark acquired the rights to Charlie Brown, the orchestration was rewritten from the original version. The complete orchestration contained a piano, bass, guitar, percussion, five woodwind parts, two trumpets, horn, trombone, and strings. The piano player can also be doubled on celeste, toy piano, and melodica; the first woodwind plays flute and piccolo; the second is the second flute part; the third and fourth are the first and second clarinet parts respectively; the fifth on bass clarinet and tenor sax. Any guitar, horn, and string parts (excluding bass) were all optional.

When Charlie Brown was brought back to Broadway in 1999, the orchestration was deeply revised, containing a five-piece orchestra that consisted of a piano, bass, percussion, a woodwind player, and a violinist. The piano player can double on keyboard synthesizer and kazoo; the bass player doubles on electric and acoustic bass, tenor recorder, and kazoo (in the original Broadway pit the bass player also doubled on acoustic and electric guitar); the woodwind part doubles on piccolo, flute, clarinet, soprano and alto sax, soprano recorder, and kazoo; the violin part also doubles on viola, alto recorder, kazoo, and tambourine. The percussionist primarily plays drum set but doubles on vibraphone, bells, triangle, timpani, and xylophone, with the parts intended to be played with a synthesizer. This version is also available through Tams-Witmark.

Casts

Notes: The character of "Sally" was added in the 1999 revival, replacing "Patty" from the original version. Sally was then used for the 2016 revival as well. The characters of Patty and Schroeder do not appear on the concept album.

Articles about the 1999 revision while it was in previews noted that the one difference between the original production and the 1999 version was that the latter reflected the increased ethnic diversity of casting over the decades that had passed, with Schroeder being played by an African American actor (Mathis) and Linus by an Asian American (Wong).

Response
The off-Broadway production was well received, with The Village Voice praising the simplistic set and "strikingly talented" cast. Walter Kerr in The New York Times called the show "a miracle", saying, "Almost everything works, because almost everything is effortless."

In reviewing the 1999 revival, Playbill'''s Steven Suskin found it "overblown and underwhelming. The scenic and musical enhancements were especially harmful, it seemed to me; the unassuming, child-size characters were overwhelmed… Which is not to say that the 1999 music department did a bad job; it's simply that the concept of a big, new 'You're a Good Man, Charlie Brown' worked against the inherent qualities of the material." In The New York Times, Ben Brantley wrote a lukewarm review:

Brantley did praise some of the cast, saying, "Kristin Chenoweth's performance as Sally will be the part that should seal her reputation. This glow cast by a star-in-the-making gives a real Broadway magic to a show that otherwise feels sadly shrunken… And Roger Bart, in the plum role of Snoopy, the charismatic beagle, incorporates some delightful doglike mannerisms."

Awards and nominations
Original Off-Broadway Production

1999 Broadway Revival

 Adaptations 
In 1973, the show was adapted for television in a Hallmark Hall of Fame TV special, broadcast on NBC. Actors featured in the adaptation included original 1967 cast member Bill Hinnant as Snoopy. Hinnant was the only member of the original off-Broadway cast to reprise their role in the special.

CBS aired a new prime-time animated TV special in 1985, based on the original musical. This version was the first animated depiction of Snoopy with comprehensible dialogue, voiced by Robert Towers, who previously portrayed the role in the 1967 Los Angeles production alongside Burghoff as Charlie Brown and Judy Kaye as Lucy.

Original cast albums have been released for all three versions of the stage show, however the 1973  Hallmark Hall of Fame recording on Atlantic Records is no longer in print.

See alsoSnoopy! The MusicalDog Sees God: Confessions of a Teenage Blockhead''

References

External links

You're a Good Man, Charlie Brown 1999 at the Internet Broadway Database
You're a Good Man, Charlie Brown at the Internet Off-Broadway Database
Tams-Witmark plot synopsis and production information

1967 musicals
Broadway musicals
Drama Desk Award-winning musicals
Musicals based on comic strips
Off-Broadway musicals
Works based on Peanuts (comic strip)
Peanuts music
West End musicals
Tony Award-winning musicals